The Golden Mile was an Allied POW camp in 1945 on the fertile Rhine plain known as the Golden Mile near Remagen in Germany.

History 
Towards the end of the Second World War, US troops established prisoner of war camps along the River Rhine for the detention of German soldiers. During the conquest of the Rhineland 250,000 German soldiers were captured and, following the destruction of the Ruhr Pocket, another 325,000 joined them. From mid-April 1945 around 660,000 Germans  were held in these camps.
After the collapse of the Western Front, the Americans – themselves suffering from supply shortages – had to accommodate and care for German prisoners of war as well as two million of their own soldiers. The so-called Rheinwiesenlager ("Rhine Pasture Camps") were intended as transit camps, offering temporary accommodation for the prisoners. The Golden Mile was one of these camps.

The camp 
The camp occupied the area between Remagen and Niederbreisig. On 8 May 1945 it was occupied by 253,000 prisoners. Built for the most part by the prisoners themselves, the camp was surrounded by barbed wire and divided into two separate areas: the first allocated to town of Remagen, the second to the town of Sinzig. Both camp areas were bounded on the east by the Rhine and on the west by the embankment of a railway line.

Inside the camp, individual "cages", separated from one another by barbed wire, held  the prisoners in groups of fifty, hundred or a thousand.

Care and housing 
The care and housing of prisoners was extremely poor. There were initially neither wooden huts or shelters nor appropriate washing and toilet facilities. Only a few prisoners were allowed to keep a strip of canvas or a coat. The rest were exposed to the hardships of the April weather, with its frequent rain. Some prisoners dug holes in the ground using their hands and primitive tools to seek shelter from the rain. Many died in the temporary dwellings or were buried alive when their burrows collapsed. There was an issue of food once a day. This was initially barely enough to survive. Only after weeks did food for the prisoners improve. Even the drinking water supply was a problem to begin with, and prisoners had to queue for hours to get a little, strongly chlorinated, Rhine water.

Closure of the camp and aftermath 
On 11 July 1945, the camp was taken over by the French, who finally closed it on 20 July 1945. Many of the prisoners were transferred to other camps or to France and some were not released until one or two years later. During the time that the camp was in existence, 1,247 inmates died of dysentery, undernourishment and exhaustion. In spite of this relatively low death rate of under 1%, many survivors returned from imprisonment traumatized by their experience.

Commemoration sites 

Today, the prisoners are commemorated by the Black Madonna Chapel in Remagen, a monument in Sinzig, the war cemetery in Bad Bodendorf and an exhibition room in the Remagen Bridge Peace Museum.

References

Literature

Sources 
 Wolfgang Gückelhorn: Das Ende am Rhein – Kriegsende zwischen Remagen und Andernach, Aachen, 2005
 Karlheinz Grohs: Die schwarze Madonna von Remagen – 1945: Kriegsgefangen am Rhein – Gedenken und Erinnerung,Remagen, 1993

External links 
Kurt Kleemann: 'Geplanter Tod in der Goldenen Meile? Das Kriegsgefangenenlager Remagen/Sinzig 1945', in: Kreisverwaltung Ahrweiler (publ.): 'Heimatjahrbuch des Kreises Ahrweiler 1995', Bad Neuenahr-Ahrweiler, 1994, p. 107
Leonhard Janta: 'Die »Goldene Meile«, ein Feld des Jammers im Frühjahr 1945. Das Kriegsgefangenenlager zwischen Remagen und Niederbreisig und der Lyriker Günter Eich', in: Kreisverwaltung Ahrweiler (publ.): 'Heimatjahrbuch des Kreises Ahrweiler 1983', Bad Neuenahr-Ahrweiler, 1982, p. 79

1945 in military history
World War II prisoner of war camps in Germany
20th century in Rhineland-Palatinate
Middle Rhine